The Mixed synchronized 3 metre springboard competition of the diving events at the 2015 World Aquatics Championships was held on 2 August 2015.

Results
The final was held at 15:00.

References

Mixed synchronized 3 metre springboard
World Aquatics Championships